Ballyhoo is a South African musical group, who had a charts-topping hit in South Africa in 1981 with "Man on the Moon", which spent 19 weeks in the charts.

The band was formed in Johannesburg in 1974. The original lineup consisted of:
 Derrick Dryan - vocals
 Attie van Wyk - keyboards
 Mick Matthews - guitar and vocals
 Fergie Ferguson - bass and vocals
 Cedric Samson - drums

The current line-up is a three-piece:
Ashley Brokensha
Derrick Dryan
Fergie Ferguson

Discography
Ballyhoo (1976)
Standing Room Only (1977)
Man On The Moon (1981)
Ballyhoo Too (1982)
Alive (1989)

References

South African musical groups